= Public corporation =

Public corporation may refer to:

- Government-owned corporation
- Public company, i.e. a limited liability company that offers its securities for sale to the public
- Statutory corporation, i.e. a corporation created by statute that is owned in part or in whole by a government, such as municipal councils, bar councils, universities)
